The Cortinariaceae are a large family of gilled mushrooms found worldwide, containing over 2100 species. The family takes its name from its largest genus, the varied species of the genus Cortinarius. Many genera formerly in the Cortinariaceae have been placed in various other families, including Hymenogastraceae, Inocybaceae and Bolbitiaceae.

The deadly toxin orellanine has been found in at least 34 Cortinariaceae.

Taxonomy
Cortinariaceae is a family of mushrooms within the Order Agaricales. The spore producing hymenium is located on the gills. The pileipellis is a cutis. The spores are brown in deposit and, in most genera in this family, the spores are ornamented.

In 2022 the family Cortinariaceae, which previously contained only the one genus of Cortinarius was reclassified based on genomic data and split into the genera of Cortinarius, Aureonarius, Austrocortinarius, Calonarius, Cystinarius, Hygronarius, Mystinarius, Phlegmacium, Thaxterogaster and Volvanarius. Numerous Cortinarius species were transferred into these genera as a result of this work and many new species were described.

Differences in genera
Cortinarius are mushrooms with warted spores, which are rusty-brown in deposit. Mushrooms in this genus have a partial veil which is a cortina. These mushrooms are terrestrial and mycorrhizal, and can range from small to large and fleshy.

Edibility
Despite the vast number of species in Cortinariaceae, this group is not widely eaten, and is generally avoided. There are many toxic species in this group and few are highly prized.

Cortinarius is one of the largest mushroom families, but due to the large amount of inedible and toxic species, most authors recommend not eating any Cortinarius. At one point, the Polish ate the fool's webcap, Cortinarius orellanus, until people began to get poisoned from eating the mushroom. It is now known that several Cortinarius species contain a deadly toxin, orellanine, which causes kidney failure. Most Cortinarius are either too small or unpleasant-tasting to eat, but some, such as the gypsy mushroom (Cortinarius caperatus) and the large and tasty Cortinarius praestans, are highly esteemed. However, some mycologists believe that no Cortinarius should be eaten.

See also
List of Agaricales families

References

 
Basidiomycota families